KF Vitia (FC Vitia) is a professional football club based in Vitina, Kosovo.

Players

 

Vitia
Vitia
Vitia